The following lists events in the year 1980 in China.

Incumbents
Chairman of the Chinese Communist Party – Hua Guofeng
Chairman of the Congress – Ye Jianying (head of state)
Premier – Hua Guofeng (until September), Zhao Ziyang (starting September)
Chairman of the Chinese People's Political Consultative Conference – Deng Xiaoping
Vice Premier of the People's Republic of China – Deng Xiaoping (until September 13), Wan Li (starting September 13)

Governors  
 Governor of Anhui Province – Zhang Jingfu 
 Governor of Fujian Province – Ma Xingyuan 
 Governor of Gansu Province – Feng Jixin then Li Dengying 
 Governor of Guangdong Province – Xi Zhongxun 
 Governor of Guizhou Province – Su Gang (starting unknown)
 Governor of Hebei Province – Li Erzhong (starting unknown)
 Governor of Heilongjiang Province – Chen Lei 
 Governor of Henan Province – Liu Jie   
 Governor of Hubei Province – Chen Pixian then Han Ningfu 
 Governor of Hunan Province – Sun Guozhi 
 Governor of Jiangsu Province – Hui Yuyu
 Governor of Jiangxi Province – Bai Dongcai
 Governor of Jilin Province – Wang Enmao then Yu Ke 
 Governor of Liaoning Province – Chen Puru (starting unknown)
 Governor of Qinghai Province – Zhang Guosheng 
 Governor of Shaanxi Province – Yu Mingtao 
 Governor of Shandong Province – Su Yiran 
 Governor of Shanxi Province – Luo Guibo 
 Governor of Sichuan Province – Lu Dadong
 Governor of Yunnan Province – Liu Minghui 
 Governor of Zhejiang Province – Li Fengping

Events
May 20 – Guangming Huaqiao Electronic Industry, as predecessor of Konka Group was founded.

Establishments
Central Political and Legal Affairs Commission
Shenzhen Special Economic Zone
State Intellectual Property Office
Tianjin Zoo
World Economic Herald
Xiamen Special Economic Zone
Yan'an Ershilipu Airport
Zhuhai Special Economic Zone

Culture
 1980 in Chinese film

Sport
China at the 1980 Winter Olympics won no medals

Births
November 7 – Sam Chui, Chinese-Australian aviation and travel blogger, photographer, and author

References

 
China
Years of the 20th century in China
1980s in China
China